Alex Petan (born May 2, 1992) is an Italian professional ice hockey player for Fehérvár AV19 in the ICE Hockey League (ICEHL) and the Italian national team.

Petan was born on May 2, 1992, in Delta, British Columbia to mother Rosanna and father Franc. Alex has a younger brother who is also a hockey player, Nic.

He represented Italy at the 2021 IIHF World Championship and the 2022 IIHF World Championship.

References

External links

1992 births
Living people
Bolzano HC players
Canadian people of Italian descent
Cleveland Monsters players
Expatriate ice hockey players in Germany
Italian expatriate ice hockey people
Expatriate ice hockey players in the United States
Fehérvár AV19 players
Ice hockey people from British Columbia
Iserlohn Roosters players
Italian ice hockey right wingers
Iowa Wild players
Michigan Tech Huskies men's ice hockey players
Quad City Mallards (ECHL) players
People from Delta, British Columbia
AHCA Division I men's ice hockey All-Americans
Italian expatriate sportspeople in Germany
Italian expatriate sportspeople in the United States
Canadian expatriate ice hockey players in Germany
Canadian expatriate ice hockey players in the United States
Canadian expatriate ice hockey players in Hungary
Italian expatriate sportspeople in Hungary
Expatriate ice hockey players in Hungary